Ashok (born 12 September 1951) is an Indian actor in the Kannada film industry, known for drama roles. His notable films include Ranganayaki, Sanadi Appanna, Bayalu Daari, Archana, Chellida Rakta, Thayiya Madilalli, Raja Maharaja and Krantiyogi Basavanna.

Early life
Ashok was born to V. Lakshmi Narasimhaiah, a police inspector and Puttamma in Anekal. To become a film star was his childhood ambition. No sooner had he completed his degree, than he applied to NSD, FTTI, Pune and the Madras Film Institute. He  was admitted to the Madras Film Institute and even topped the course.

Career
His first Kannada film was Hennu Samsarada Kannu opposite Sridevi. He mainly acted in romantic movies opposite top heroines Aarati and Manjula during the late seventies and early eighties. He also set up a small-scale industry, which is his main source of income. In 1986, he became the founding president of the Karnataka Film Artists, Workers and Technicians Union. He is also an activist in many movements, including the Gokak movement and Raitha Sangha protests.

Filmography 
Following list is Incomplete.

References

External links 
 

Male actors in Kannada cinema
Indian male film actors
Male actors from Karnataka
People from Bangalore Urban district
Living people
1951 births
20th-century Indian male actors
21st-century Indian male actors